Bangladesh Infantry Regimental Centre is an infantry training centre of Bangladesh Army. It is located within Rajshahi Cantonment. The centre was established on 1 July 1999.

References

1999 establishments in Bangladesh
Organisations based in Rajshahi
Bangladesh Armed Forces education and training establishments